Antje  is a female name. It is a Low German and Dutch diminutive form of Anna. Once a very common name in the northern part of the Netherlands, its popularity has steadily declined since 1900.

People 

Antje "Nina" Baanders-Kessler (1915–2002), Dutch sculptor and medalist
Antje Blumenthal (born 1947), German politician, member of the Christian Democratic Union
Antje Boetius (born 1967), German marine biologist
Antje Buschschulte (born 1978), German swimmer
Antje Duvekot (born 1976), singer-songwriter and guitarist based in Somerville, Massachusetts
Antje Danielson (born 1957), German-born American geochemist, co-founder of Zipcar
Antje Frank (born 1968), German rower
 (1951–1993), German television presenter
Antje Gleichfeld (born 1938), German middle-distance runner who specialized in the 800 metres
Antje Harvey (born 1967), German cross country skier and biathlete
Antje Huber (1924–2015), German Minister for Youth, Family and Health
Antje Jackelén (born 1955), Swedish Lutheran Archbishop of Uppsala
 (born 1945), German medical doctor and TV presenter of health related programs
Antje Angela Malestein (born 1993), Dutch handball player
Antje Geertje "Ans" Markus (born 1947), Dutch painter
Antje Möldner-Schmidt (born 1984), German middle-distance runner
Antje Nikola Mönning (born 1978), German actress
Antje Paarlberg (1808–1885), Dutch emigrant to the United States, inspiration for the novel "So Big"
Antje Elisabeth "Anne" van Schuppen (born 1960), Dutch long-distance runner
Antje Stille (born 1961), East German swimmer
Antje Rávic Strubel (born 1974), German writer
Antje Traue (born 1981), German actress
Antje Vollmer (born 1943), German Green Party politician
Antje Vowinckel (born 1964), German radio artist and musician
Antje Weithaas (born 1966), German classical violinist
Antje Zöllkau (born 1963), East German javelin thrower

Fictional 

Frau Antje, fictional Dutch character used in the advertising of Dutch cheese in Germany

See also
 
Annie, an alternative diminutive of Anna

References

Dutch feminine given names
German feminine given names